The 2014–15 LEB Plata season is the 14th season of the LEB Plata, the Spanish basketball third division. It is named Adecco Plata as its sponsored identity.

Team information and location

Notes: Viten Getafe is the new name of last season's champion Fundación Baloncesto Fuenlabrada, the reserve team of Baloncesto Fuenlabrada. It was moved to Getafe after an agreement with the club CB Getafe.

Regular season league table

Playoffs

Copa LEB Plata
At the half of the league, the two first teams in the table play the Copa LEB Plata at home of the winner of the first half season (13th round). If this team doesn't want to host the Copa LEB Plata, the second qualified can do it. If nobody wants to host it, the Federation will propose a neutral venue.

The Champion of this Cup will play the play-offs as first qualified if it finishes the league between the 2nd and the 5th qualified.

Teams qualified
Amics Castelló is the first qualified as the leader of the first half of the season.

|}

The game

Final standings

Stats leaders in regular season

Points

Rebounds

Assists

Performance Index Rating

See also
2014–15 ACB season
2014–15 LEB Oro season

References

External links
Official website

LEB Plata seasons
LEB3